The Bahamas International Open is a defunct men's tennis founded in 1972. In 1975 the tournament that was part of Bill Riordan's International Players Association (IPA) circuit, that event with $50,000 prize money was held in Freeport, Bahamas. It was moved to Nassau in 1976 and was played on outdoor hard courts until 1980.

History
In 1922 a Bahamas International Championships was founded in Nassau and was played on outdoor clay courts. That first tournament was staged though till 1936 when it was discontinued. This second Bahamas International tournament was founded in 1972 again in Nassau, but was played on outdoor hard courts. In 1975 the tournament moved to Freeport for one edition only before returning back to Nassau until 1980 when the tournament was discontinued.

Past finals
Incomplete roll

References

External links
 ATP Singles draw
 ITF Singles draw

ATP Tour
Defunct tennis tournaments in the Bahamas
Defunct sports competitions in the Bahamas
Recurring sporting events established in 1972
Recurring sporting events disestablished in 1980
Tennis in the Bahamas